Hamid Al-Shaeri (born Abdel-Hamid Ali Ahmed; 29 November 1961) is an Egyptian-Libyan singer, songwriter, and musician residing in Cairo.  He is known as representative of Westernized synthesizer in Arabic songs. Born in Benghazi, to an Egyptian mother, and a Libyan father. His best known songs include "Law laki" (If Not for You), sung by the Libyan artist Ali Hemeida, and "Jaljili", which he sang himself.

On 19 February 2011, Hamid el Shaeri condemned the actions of Muammar Gadaffi, his native country's ruler, against the Libyan people and issued a popular call to the fellow Egyptians to aid them.

He has four children: two daughters, Nabila and Nora EL Shaeri, and two sons, Nadeem and Nouh El Shaeri.

In 2017, Pitchfork described his song "Ayonha" as the "most arresting track" on Habibi Funk's seventh release.

Discography

Notable Studio Albums

Notable Collaborations

Notable Production for Other Artists

References

1961 births
Living people
20th-century Egyptian male singers
Singers who perform in Egyptian Arabic
20th-century Libyan male singers
Rotana Records artists
21st-century Egyptian male singers